Mazindol (brand names Mazanor, Sanorex) is a stimulant drug which is used as an appetite suppressant. It was developed by Sandoz-Wander in the 1960s.

Medical uses
Mazindol is used in short-term (i.e., a few weeks) treatment of obesity, in combination with a regimen of weight reduction based on caloric restriction, exercise, and behavior modification in people with a body mass index greater than 30, or in those with a body mass index greater than 27 in the presence of risk factors such as hypertension, diabetes, or hyperlipidemia. Mazindol is not currently available as a commercially marketed and FDA-regulated prescription agent for the treatment of obesity.

There is a Swiss study investigating its efficacy in treating ADHD.

Additional patented uses include for the treatment of schizophrenia, reducing cravings for cocaine, and for the treatment of neurobehavioral disorders.

Pharmacology

Mazindol is a sympathomimetic amine, which is similar to amphetamine. It stimulates the central nervous system, which increases heart rate and blood pressure, and decreases appetite. Sympathomimetic anoretics (appetite suppressants) are used in the short-term treatment of obesity. Their appetite-reducing effect tends to decrease after a few weeks of treatment. Because of this, these medicines are useful only during the first few weeks of a weight-loss program.

Although the mechanism of action of the sympathomimetics in the treatment of obesity is not fully known, these medications have pharmacological effects similar to those of amphetamines. Like other sympathomimetic appetite suppressants, mazindol is thought to act as a reuptake inhibitor of norepinephrine. In addition, it inhibits dopamine and serotonin reuptake. The recommended dosage is 2 mg per day for 90 days in patients 40 kg overweight and under; 4 mg a day in patients more than 50 kg overweight; divided into two doses separated by a 12-hour window between each  dose.

Overdose
Symptoms of a mazindol overdose include: restlessness, tremor, rapid breathing, confusion, hallucinations, panic, aggressiveness, nausea, vomiting, diarrhea, an irregular heartbeat, and seizures.

Analogues
An analogue of mazindol was reported that was stated to be less toxic than the parent drug from which it was derived. It is made from Chemrat (Pindone).

QSAR Dialog
 From available QSAR data, the following trends are apparent:
 Desoxylation of the tertiary alcohol in mazindol improves DAT and SERT binding without substantially reducing NET affinity. 
 Removal of the p-chlorine atom from the phenyl ring of mazindol increases NET affinity and substantially reduces DAT and SERT affinity.
 Expansion of the imidazoline ring system in mazindol to the corresponding six-membered homolog increases DAT affinity by ~10 fold.
 Replacement of the phenyl moiety with a naphthyl ring system results in a ~50 fold increase in SERT affinity without significant decreases in NET or DAT affinities. 
 Halogenation of 3' and/or 4' position  of the phenyl ring of mazindol results in increased potency at NET, DAT, and SERT.
 Fluorination of the 7' position of the tricyclic phenyl ring results in a ~2 fold increase in binding affinity to the DAT.

Chemistry

Tautomers
 Mazindol exhibits pH dependent keto-enol tautomerization. Mazindol exists in the tricycic (-ol) form in neutral media and undergoes protonation to the benzophenone tautomer in acidic media. QSAR studies have indicated that the ability of mazindol to inhibit NE and DA reuptake may be mediated by the protonated (benzophenone) tautomer.

Synthesis

The synthesis of mazindol starts by reaction of a substituted benzoylbenzoic acid (1) with ethylenediamine. The product 3 can be rationalized as being an aminal from the initially formed monoamide 2. This is then subjected to reduction with LiAlH4 and-without isolation-air oxidation. Reduction probably proceeds to the mixed aminal/carbinolamine 4; such a product would be expected to be in equilibrium with the alternate aminal 5. The latter would be expected to predominate because of the greater stability of aldehyde aminals over the corresponding ketone derivatives. Air oxidation of the tetrahydroimidazole to the imidazoline will then remove 5 from the equilibrium. There is thus obtained the anorectic agent mazindol (6). The synthesis of homomazindol (the six-member ring A homologue) is accomplished by substitution of 1,2-diaminoethane with 1,3-diaminopropane.

Research
As of 2016 mazindol was being studied in clinical trials for attention-deficit hyperactivity disorder.

See also 
 Ciclazindol
 Setazindol
 Trazium
 Serotonin–norepinephrine–dopamine reuptake inhibitor (SNDRI)

Notes

References

Tertiary alcohols
Chlorobenzenes
Imidazolines
Serotonin–norepinephrine–dopamine reuptake inhibitors
Stimulants
Sympathomimetic amines